Lamé's special quartic, named after Gabriel Lamé, is the graph of the equation

where .  It looks like a rounded square with "sides" of length  and centered on the origin.  This curve is a squircle centered on the origin, and it is a special case of a superellipse.

Because of Pierre de Fermat's only surviving proof, that of the n = 4 case of Fermat's Last Theorem, if r is rational there is no non-trivial rational point (x, y) on this curve (that is, no point for which both x and y are non-zero rational numbers).

References

Equations